The Bosnia and Herzegovina–Palestine relations are the bilateral relations between Bosnia and Herzegovina and the State of Palestine. The countries recognized each other on 27 May 1992. Palestine has an embassy in Sarajevo. Bosnia does not have diplomatic representation in Palestine, but its embassy in Cairo is accredited to the Palestinian side. In the past, both countries were part of the Ottoman Empire.

History
During the 1948 Palestine war, Bosnian volunteers fought for the Arab side.

In 1999, following reports of Bosnia and Herzegovina's intention to open its embassy in Israel in Jerusalem, the Presidency of Bosnia and Herzegovina categorically denied this and confirmed that its embassy would be in Tel Aviv. The presidency also stressed that the establishment of diplomatic relations with Israel would not be against the Arab–Israeli peace process and would promote efforts to achieve a peaceful settlement in the Middle East.

References

Bosnia and Herzegovina
Bilateral relations of Bosnia and Herzegovina